Hiranandani Foundation School is situated in Powai, Mumbai. The school pursues the IB, IGSCE board as well as ICSE and ISC. It is an English medium school. But Hindi is also taught

History
The Hiranandani Foundation School was established in 1990 in Hiranandani Gardens with a handful of students and now it has grown to 2,610 students. The school started up with ICSE and then ISC and IBDP were introduced.

Campus
The Hiranandani Foundation School at Powai comprises two buildings. The old school building is a four-storeyed building, which consists of two wings, and a playing field. The new school building was inaugurated on 13 June 2007, and is only used by the secondary section. The new school building is five storied as well, but is much larger than the other school. The new school was included for the students from ninth to twelfth for the first two years. The secondary section has been extended to eleventh standard in 2007-2008, and twelfth in 2009 and after.

Principals

 Dr. S. V. Krishnan
 Padma A. Vaswani
 Dr. S. V. Krishnan (till August 2008)
 Kalyani Patnaik

Houses
The houses are Alpha (red), Beta (deep green), Delta (fluorescent blue) and Sigma (medium yellow).

Motto
The school's motto is "Mens sana in corpore sano" ("A Sound Mind in a Sound Body").

Events celebrated
 Founders day to celebrate the birthday of founder Dr LH Hiranandani
 Independence Day
 Republic Day
 Children's Day
 Hindi Day (hindi diwas)
 U4ya - school festival
 Teachers Day
Sports day
Annual day
Cross country marathon
HFS MUN
HFS Stock Exchange
HFS Mindscape
HFS Liga

See also
List of schools in Mumbai

References

Schools in Mumbai
1990 establishments in Maharashtra
Educational institutions established in 1990

External links
http://www.hiranandani.com/Hiranandani_School.aspx